Barbora Záhlavová-Strýcová was the defending champion, but lost in the quarterfinals to Mona Barthel.

Kirsten Flipkens won her maiden WTA singles title, defeating Lucie Hradecká 6–1, 7–5 in the final.

Seeds

Main draw

Finals

Top half

Bottom half

Qualifying

Seeds

Qualifiers

Lucky loser
 Jessica Pegula

Qualifying draw

First qualifier

Second qualifier

Third qualifier

Fourth qualifier

References
Main Draw
Qualifying Draw

Challenge Bell
Tournoi de Québec
Can